The Central Association was an American minor league baseball league.  It began operations in 1908, as it was essentially renamed from the 1907 Iowa State League. The Central Association ran continuously through 1917. It was reorganized thirty years later, operating as a Class-C league from 1947-1949, with major league affiliates for most teams. Baseball Hall of Fame members Grover Cleveland Alexander (Galesburg), Jake Beckley (Hannibal), Burleigh Grimes (Ottumwa) and Sam Rice (Galesburg and Muscatine) are league alumni.

1908–1917 league
In 1908, The Central Association formed with charter members: Burlington Pathfinders (Burlington, Iowa), Jacksonville Lunatics (Jacksonville, Illinois), Keokuk Indians (Keokuk, Iowa), Oskaloosa Quakers (Oskaloosa, Iowa), Ottumwa Packers (Ottumwa, Iowa), Quincy Gems (Quincy, Illinois) and the Waterloo Lulus (Waterloo, Iowa) all had been members of the 1907 Iowa State League.  A new team in Kewanee, Illinois, the Kewanee Boilermakers, joined as well.

In 1909, the Oskaloosa Quakers franchise folded and the Hannibal Cannibals (Hannibal, Missouri) moved from the Illinois–Missouri League. In 1910, Jacksonville moved to the Northern Association and Waterloo moved to the Illinois–Indiana–Iowa League. The Galesburg Pavers (Galesburg, Illinois) and Monmouth Browns (Monmouth, Illinois) joined after having left the Illinois–Missouri League. For the 1911 season, Quincy moved to the Illinois–Indiana–Iowa League and the Muscatine Camels (Muscatine, Iowa) formed and joined the league.

For 1913, Galesburg and Hannibal folded, with the Cedar Rapids Rabbits (Cedar Rapids, Iowa), and Waterloo Jays (Waterloo, Iowa) forming to join the league. In 1914, Kewanee and Monmouth folded while the Clinton Pilots (Clinton, Iowa) and Marshalltown Ansons  (Marshalltown, Iowa) formed and joined the league. Ottumwa moved to Rock Island, Illinois, as the Rock Island Islanders and then again to Galesburg, as the Galesburg Pavers.

In 1915, Galesburg folded and the Mason City Claydiggers (Mason City, Iowa) formed and joined the league. The Clinton team folded during the season. The league also threw out several wins by Keokuk (1), Marshalltown (5), Waterloo (1), and Clinton (40) after the fact.

Keokuk folded in 1916, while the Clinton Pilots rejoined and the Fort Dodge Dodgers (Fort Dodge, Iowa) formed and joined the league. Burlington moved to become the Ottumwa Packers on July 20, and Muscatine also forfeited 34 wins in 1916.

In the final season, 1917, Muscatine and Ottumwa folded.  The Dubuque Dubs in Dubuque, Iowa and the La Crosse Infants (La Crosse, Wisconsin) formed and joined the league. Dubuque moved to Charles City, Iowa on July 4 to become the Charles City Tractorites. Cedar Rapids moved to Clear Lake, Iowa on July 27, finishing the season as the Clear Lake Rabbits. Clinton and La Crosse both folded before the end of the season on July 17. After the season, the league, and all teams in it, folded.

1947–1949 league

In 1947, a new league of the same name was created with major league affiliations. The Clinton Cubs (Chicago Cubs) in Clinton, Iowa; Hannibal Pilots (St. Louis Browns), Hannibal, Missouri; Rockford Rox (Cincinnati Reds), Rockford, Illinois; Keokuk Pirates (Pittsburgh Pirates), Keokuk, Iowa; Burlington Indians (Cleveland Indians), Burlington, Iowa, and the Moline A's, (Philadelphia A's) Moline, Illinois were the charter members of the reformed league.

In 1948, the Moline A's moved to Kewanee, Illinois to become the Kewanee A's in mid-season. In 1949, the Hannibal Pilots folded and the Cedar Rapids Rockets of Cedar Rapids, Iowa formed to join the league. Kewanee captured the 1949 championship. After the 1949 season, Cedar Rapids joined the Illinois–Indiana–Iowa League, and the rest of the teams, and the league itself, folded.

Cities represented

Burlington, IA: Burlington Pathfinders 1908–1916; Burlington Indians 1947–1949
Cedar Rapids, IA: Cedar Rapids Rabbits 1913–1917; Cedar Rapids Rockets 1949 
Charles City, IA: Charles City Tractorites 1917 
Clear Lake, IA: Clear Lake Rabbits 1917 
Clinton, IA: Clinton Pilots 1914–1917; Clinton Cubs 1947–1948; Clinton Steers 1949
Dubuque, IA: Dubuque Dubs 1917 
Fort Dodge, IA: Fort Dodge Dodgers 1916–1917 
Galesburg, IL: Galesburg Pavers 1910–1912; Galesburg Pavers 1914
Hannibal, MO: Hannibal Cannibals 1909–1912; Hannibal Pilots 1947–1948
Jacksonville, IL: Jacksonville Lunatics 1908; Jacksonville Braves 1909 
Keokuk, IA: Keokuk Indians 1908–1915; Keokuk Pirates 1947–1949 
Kewanee, IL: Kewanee Boilermakers 1908–1913; Kewanee A's 1948–1949
LaCrosse, WI: La Crosse Infants 1917 
Marshalltown, IA: Marshalltown Ansons 1914–1917 
Mason City, IA: Mason City Claydiggers 1915–1917
Moline, IL: Moline A's 1947–1948 
Monmouth, IL: Monmouth Browns 1910–1913
Muscatine, IA: Muscatine Camels 1911; Muscatine Wallopers 1912–1913; Muscatine Buttonmakers 1914; Muscatine Muskies 1915–1916 
Oskaloosa, IA: Oskaloosa Quakers 1908
Ottumwa, IA: Ottumwa Packers 1908–1910; Ottumwa Speedboys 1911–1912; Ottumwa Packers 1913–1914; Ottumwa Packers 1916 
Rockford, IL: Rockford Rox 1947–1949
Quincy, IL: Quincy Gems 1908; Quincy Vets 1909–1910 
Rock Island, IL: Rock Island Islanders 1914 
Waterloo, IA: Waterloo Lulus 1908–1909; Waterloo Jays 1913–1915; Waterloo Shamrocks 1916; Waterloo Loons 1917

Standings & statistics

1908 to 1917 
1908 Central Association
 

1909 Central Association
 

1910 Central Associationschedule
 

1911 Central Associationschedule
 

1912 Central Association
 

1913 Central Association

 

1914 Central Association
Ottumwa moved to Rock Island July 17. However, the National Association would not let the Central Association invade the territory of the Three-I League, so Rock Island moved to Galesburg July 24. 

1915 Central Association
 Clinton disbanded in mid-season. Wins taken away: Clinton 40, Keokuk 18, Marshalltown 5, Waterloo 1.

1916 Central Association
Burlington moved to Ottumwa July 20. Muscatine forfeited 34 wins.
 
1917 Central Association 
Dubuque moved to Charles City July 4; Clinton & La Crosse disbanded July 17; Cedar Rapids moved to Clear Lake July 27. The season was shortened to August 7 with National Association permission.

1947 to 1949 
1947 Central Associationschedule
 Playoffs: Clinton 3 games, Rockford 2; Hannibal 3 games, Keokuk 1. Finals: Clinton 4 games, Hannibal 1.
 
1948 Central Associationschedule
 Moline (17–25) moved to Kewanee June 18. Playoffs: Clinton 4 games, Burlington 2; Keokuk 4 games, Hannibal 1. Finals: Clinton 4 games, Keokuk 0.
 
1949 Central Associationschedule
 Playoffs: Cedar Rapids 3 games, Burlington 0; Kewanee 3 games, Keokuk 0. Finals: Kewanee 4 games, Cedar Rapids 2.

Cedar Rapids beat Burlington 3 games to none, and Kewanee beat Keokuk 3 games to none, in the first round of the playoffs.  Kewanee defeated Cedar Rapids 4 games to 2 for the title.

References
Sumner, Benjamin Barrett.  Minor League Baseball Standings:All North American Leagues, Through 1999.  Jefferson, N.C.:McFarland. 

 
1908 establishments in the United States
Defunct minor baseball leagues in the United States
Baseball leagues in Illinois
Baseball leagues in Missouri
Baseball leagues in Iowa
Sports leagues established in 1908
Sports leagues disestablished in 1917
Sports leagues established in 1947
Sports leagues disestablished in 1949